Oleksandr Pavlovych Bilozerskyi (born 4 May 1964) is a Ukrainian professional football coach and a former player. As of 2009, he manages the SC Tavriya Simferopol Reserves and Youth Team.

External links
Profile at Footballfacts.ru

1964 births
Living people
Soviet footballers
Soviet expatriate footballers
Ukrainian footballers
Ukrainian expatriate footballers
Expatriate footballers in Poland
SC Tavriya Simferopol players
SKA Odesa players
FC Volyn Lutsk players
KSZO Ostrowiec Świętokrzyski players
Błękitni Kielce players
FC Kryvbas Kryvyi Rih players
FC Kremin Kremenchuk players
FC Zirka Kropyvnytskyi players
FC Podillya Khmelnytskyi players
Ukrainian Premier League players
Ukrainian football managers
Association football forwards